V/H/S/2 (originally titled S-VHS) is a 2013 found footage horror anthology film produced by Bloody Disgusting and Roxanne Benjamin. The second installment in the V/H/S franchise, it comprises four found footage segments linked together by a fifth frame narrative. V/H/S/2 features a largely different group of directors: Jason Eisener, Gareth Evans, Timo Tjahjanto, Eduardo Sánchez, and Gregg Hale, and franchise returnees Simon Barrett and Adam Wingard.

Plot
The film is presented as an anthology of short horror films, built into a frame narrative which acts as its own short horror film. Each short film is linked together with the concept of found footage (each segment is from the VHS tapes found in the first film).

Tape 49/frame narrative (Prologue)
 Directed by Simon Barrett
 Written by Simon Barrett
A college student's mother requests that private investigators Larry and his girlfriend Ayesha look into the disappearance of her son Kyle. After breaking into Kyle's dorm, they discover a large stack of VHS tapes and a laptop that contains footage from tape 56. After clicking off the video Ayesha discovers the laptop is still recording. On this laptop recording, Kyle discusses the VHS tapes, and Larry tells Ayesha to watch the tapes while he inspects the house. As Ayesha watches the first tape, a figure peers from the shadows.

Phase I Clinical Trials
 Directed by Adam Wingard
 Written by Simon Barrett
In a doctor's office, Herman Middleton is fitted with an ocular implant to replace his right eye, damaged in a car accident. The doctor informs Herman that he may experience some "glitches" as the implant is still in its experimental stage. As he leaves the clinic, Herman notices a young red-haired woman staring at him intently. Returning home, Herman plays video games, then goes to make a cup of tea. He returns from the kitchen to find his game controller far from where he left it, and his teakettle then suddenly crashes to the ground. Later, Herman sees what appears to be the outline of a figure lying under the sheets on his bed, but when he pulls back the sheets, the bed is empty, but when he looks up, he comes face to face with a bleeding, seemingly undead man, and flees to the bathroom. After phoning his doctor to demand he addresses the problem, Herman emerges from the bathroom and encounters the man again, this time with a young girl who also appears to be dead. Herman runs back to the bathroom and endures a night of banging on the door from the other side. He ends up sleeping in the bathtub overnight.

The next day, the red-haired girl from the hospital comes to his house, saying she is experiencing a similar situation. Giving her name Clarissa, she explains that she was born deaf and had a cochlear implant installed in her ear, giving her the ability to hear new frequencies, including those of ghosts. Herman suggests removing the implant, but Clarissa says that doing so will only keep Herman from seeing the ghosts, not getting rid of them. As Clarissa claims that the ghosts will get stronger and more dangerous the longer one pays attention to them, an overweight, bloodied man in his underwear appears behind her. Herman alerts her to his presence, but Clarissa says she already knows he is there and that he is her uncle, who according to her "wasn't a nice person". Clarissa initiates sex with Herman to divert his attention away from the ghosts.

Sometimes later, Herman awakens and sees Clarissa sleeping on the couch. He finds the young girl in his bed and flees, before witnessing Clarissa being dragged into the pool by an unseen entity. Despite Herman's best efforts to save her, Clarissa drowns. Running back through the house in an attempt to escape the ghosts, Herman locks himself in his bathroom again and uses a straight razor to cut out the implant. The ghosts of Clarissa and her uncle appear in the bathroom as Herman tries to escape, but he unwittingly runs directly into the ghosts of the young girl and the man, who strangles him. The man grabs the implant, still attached to the razor, and shoves it deep into Herman's throat, killing him.

Tape 49 (Interlude 1)

Back in the frame story, Ayesha calls Larry into the room, where they discuss the tapes' legitimacy. Larry tells Ayesha to continue viewing the tapes. She continues playing Kyle's video, where he explains that the tapes must be watched in a proper sequence "to affect you." Ayesha finds a new tape and proceeds to watch it.

A Ride in the Park
 Directed by Eduardo Sánchez and Gregg Hale
 Written by Jamie Nash
After answering a call from his girlfriend Amy, cyclist Mike affixes a camera to his helmet and goes on a bike ride through the woods of a state park. He abruptly comes across a terrified, blood-covered woman, who begs him to help her boyfriend, before she begins vomiting blood. Mike sees several zombies approaching them before the woman suddenly turns into a zombie herself and bites Mike on the throat. After he manages to kill the woman, Mike staggers through the woods, heavily bleeding, before he too vomits blood, collapses, and apparently dies.

A pair of bikers, a man and a woman, come across him and attempt to call for help, but Mike reanimates, attacks, and kills the man before attacking and biting the woman before she runs off into the woods. He begins devouring the man as the woman returns, having become a zombie as well. She joins Mike in devouring the man before he too reanimates. Hearing noise in the distance, the three zombies head towards it, and find that the source is a young girl's birthday party. The zombified trio invade the party, killing several people, some of whom reanimate to attack others. While trying to attack a man and his three daughters in their car, Mike notices his bloodied reflection in their car window, which seems to subdue his aggressive behavior. After getting run down by a fleeing truck, he accidentally pocket dials Amy. Mike is shocked back to a semi-conscious state upon hearing her voice. Regaining some of his humanity, Mike kills himself with a discarded shotgun.

Tape 49 (Interlude 2)

Back in the frame story, Larry re-enters the room and finds Ayesha staring at the TVs in a hypnotized state with her nose bleeding. After being woken from her trance, Ayesha says she has a migraine. Larry leaves to find medicine as a seemingly entranced Ayesha proceeds to insert another tape into the VCR. As she watches, the figure from earlier crawls out from the shadows and watches her.

Safe Haven
 Directed by Timo Tjahjanto and Gareth Evans
 Story by Timo Tjahjanto; Screenplay by Tjahjanto & Gareth Evans
A film crew, composed of interviewer Malik, producer Lena (also Malik's fiancée), Malik's best friend Adam, and cameraman Joni, infiltrate a cult in Indonesia known as Paradise Gates in hopes of shooting a documentary about their mysterious activities with numerous cameras, both displayed and hidden. The film crew are invited inside the cult's compound by a woman known as "Madame". Inside, they find the walls adorned with bizarre symbols, schoolchildren in classrooms, and women dressed in white garments. The crew meets with and interviews the leader of the cult, a man referred to as "Father". During the interview, Lena becomes ill and steps out. While searching for a spare camera battery, Malik overhears a private conversation between Lena and Adam in which Lena reveals that she is pregnant with Adam's child. In the basement, Adam finds a woman with her womb carved out and strapped to a chair. The woman awakens and begins screaming and convulsing, causing him to run away.

While Father is being interviewed, a bell chimes, and he suddenly announces the "time of reckoning" over the intercom. The cultists begin a mass suicide via poison and gunshots, while Joni has his throat cut by Father after repeatedly interrupting the announcement. Lena is abducted by several women in surgical apparel, and Malik is shot dead by one of the cult members. As Adam attempts to rescue Lena, an explosion knocks him back. After watching a figure crawl across the ceiling, he stands and attempts to advance into the fiery room, only to be intercepted by Father, covered in blood with the cult's symbol inscribed on him, who tells him the time has come, then proceeds to explode into a cloud of blood and organs. Adam finds Lena on an altar with the cult's symbol carved into her skin. He kills Madame but is unable to save Lena, watching as the horned demon the cult worships (which resembles Baphomet) tears its way out of her body. As Adam attempts to flee, he is attacked by cultists and schoolchildren, including Joni and Malik, who have all risen from the dead and turned into zombie-like ghouls. Adam escapes outside to his car and drives off, only to be rammed by the demon and gravely injured. As he crawls out of the car's wreckage, the demon looks down on Adam before calling him "papa". The revelation that the demon is, in fact, his child drives Adam insane. He is last seen laughing hysterically before the camera malfunctions.

Tape 49 (Interlude 3)

Back in the frame story, Larry returns to the room with medicine, only to discover Ayesha is dead, having killed herself with a gun. A VHS tape with the word "WATCH" written on it in lipstick lies beside her. Larry picks up the tape, inserts it into the VCR, and anxiously watches it.

Slumber Party Alien Abduction

 Directed by Jason Eisener
 Written by John Davies & Jason Eisener
Brothers Gary and Randy attach a camera to their Yorkshire Terrier, Tank, to film videos at their lakeside house. Their parents leave on a romantic getaway after giving them a list of chores. Gary and Randy invite their friends Shawn and Danny over so the group can harass the brothers' older sister, Jen, her boyfriend Zack, and her friends. While the group is swimming at a nearby lake, ambushing Jen and her friends with squirt guns filled with urine, they fail to notice a grey alien hiding beneath the water.

Later that night, the group startles Jen and Zack during sex by blaring loud music and flashing lights. A deafening noise is heard, but the group does not notice. In retaliation, Jen and Zack attach another camera to Tank to catch one of the boys masturbating to a pornographic film. The deafening noise is heard again and the power goes out. Seeing a figure outside the door, Zack goes to grab Gary and Randy's father's gun. Suddenly, Zack is grabbed by the alien from earlier, along with others of its kind. The aliens abduct the rest of the group, sealing them in their sleeping bags and attempting to drown them in the lake.

Only Gary, Randy, Jen, and Tank escape, running into the woods to hide. After Tank inadvertently alerts the aliens to their location by barking, the kids run toward what they believe to be police lights and sirens, but it turns out to be a trap set by the aliens, who abduct Randy. Jen and Gary flee to a nearby barn, where the aliens drag Jen away as Gary and Tank escape up a ladder. As the aliens close in on Gary, he is suddenly pulled into the air by the alien ship's tractor beam. As Gary is pulled into the air, he is unable to hold on to Tank's leash, and Tank falls to the ground, the impact loosening the camera from his back which comes to face him. Mortally injured by the fall and unable to move, Tank whimpers as he slowly dies.

Tape 49 (Epilogue)
After watching the tape, Larry watches the webcam footage and sees Kyle explain that he and his mother want to make their own tape. Kyle then attempts suicide on-camera by shooting himself through his jaw, but survives with his lower jaw shattered, and runs off moments before Larry and Ayesha enter the house. As Larry watches it, an undead Ayesha suddenly rises and attacks him. In self-defense, Larry breaks her neck and rushes into the other room as Ayesha rises and chases after him on all fours. Larry hides in a closet and shoots Ayesha in the face when she finds him. Hearing a strange gurgling sound, he explores the closet, only to find Kyle has been hiding there the whole time. Kyle lunges at Larry and strangles him to death. Afterward, Kyle gives the camera a "thumbs up", revealing that he and his mother's plan has been successful, before turning off the camera.

Cast

Tape 49
 Lawrence Michael Levine as Larry
 Kelsy Abbott as Ayesha
 L.C. Holt as Kyle
 Simon Barrett as Steve
 Mindy Robinson as Tabitha

Phase I Clinical Trials
 Adam Wingard as Herman
 Hannah Hughes as Clarissa
 John T. Woods as Dr. Fleischer
 Corrie Lynn Fitzpatrick as Young Girl
 Brian Udovich as Bloody Man
 John Karyus as Uncle
 Casey Adams as Justin

A Ride in the Park
 Jay Saunders as Biker
 Bette Cassatt as Screaming Girl
 Dave Coyne as Good Samaritan Guy
 Wendy Donigian as Good Samaritan Girl
 Devon Brookshire as Biker's Girlfriend

Safe Haven
 Fachri Albar as Adam
 Hannah Al Rashid as Lena
 Oka Antara as Malik
 Andrew Suleiman as Joni
 Epy Kusnandar as Father
 R.R. Pinurti as Ibu Sri

Slumber Party Alien Abduction
 Rylan Logan as Gary
 Samantha Gracie as Jen
 Cohen King as Randy
 Zach Ford as Shawn
 Josh Ingraham as Danny
 Jeremie Saunders as Zack
 Frank Welker as Tank and Aliens

Production and release

The film was rushed into production in late 2012, and premiered January 19, 2013 at Park City's Library Center Theatre as part of the 2013 Sundance Film Festival, much like its predecessor.

The film was released via VOD on June 6, and theatrically on July 12. Dance punk band The Death Set recorded a song, "6 Different Ways To Die", for the film's credits.

Reception
On Rotten Tomatoes, 70% of 67 reviews were positive. The site's consensus is: "It's as scattershot as its predecessor, but V/H/S/2 rounds up enough horror filmmaking talent to deliver a satisfyingly nasty – albeit uneven – dose of gore." On Metacritic it has a score of 49% based on reviews from 21 critics, indicating "mixed or average reviews".

Borys Kit of The Hollywood Reporter wrote, "The scares are as hit-or-miss as the filmmaking".  Dennis Harvey of Variety called it "rip-roaring good time for genre fans".

On July 10, 2013, Rex Reed was the subject of controversy due to a scathing review of the film in which he admitted having walked out at the end of the first segment. His review does complain about parts of the film that happened after he left the film, but his references are rather imprecise, e.g. describing segment Slumber Party Alien Abduction as "a sleepover invaded by psycho kidnappers [as opposed to aliens] told from the perspective of a GoPro camera attached to the back of a dog" or summarizing segment A Ride in the Park as the tale of "a mountain biker pursued by flesh-eating zombies [rather than turned into one himself early on]".

Sequels
A third film in the series, titled V/H/S: Viral, was released in the US on November 21, 2014. A fourth film in the series, titled V/H/S/94, was released exclusively on Shudder on October 6, 2021.

See also
 List of films featuring extraterrestrials

References

External links
 
 
 
 

2013 films
2013 horror films
2010s ghost films
2013 independent films
Alien abduction films
American ghost films
American haunted house films
American science fiction horror films
American independent films
American sequel films
American zombie films
American pregnancy films
Indonesian horror films
Demons in film
Films about cults
Films shot in Maryland
Films shot in Nova Scotia
Found footage films
American horror anthology films
Films directed by Eduardo Sánchez (director)
Films directed by Gregg Hale (producer)
Films with screenplays by Simon Barrett (filmmaker)
Films directed by Simon Barrett (filmmaker)
2010s English-language films
Indonesian-language films
2010s American films
V/H/S (franchise)